The 11th World Trade Organization Ministerial Conference was held in Buenos Aires, Argentina, from 11 to 13 December 2017. It was chaired by Minister Susana Malcorra of Argentina. The Conference ended with a number of ministerial decisions, including on fisheries subsidies and e-commerce duties, and a commitment to continue negotiations in all areas. The conference also led to the formation of working party to enable faster induction of South Sudan in the WTO.

Security
The Argentine government prevented journalist Sally Burch from entering Argentina and she was deported to Ecuador where she lives. The head of Attac Norway, Petter Titland was also deported to Brazil on the grounds that his actions would also be disruptive.

References
 

2017 conferences
Events in Buenos Aires
2017 in Argentina
World Trade Organization ministerial conferences
December 2017 events in South America